Pothuwila is a village near Polpithigama in Sri Lanka. It is situated in Kurunegala District within the North Western Province of Sri Lanka. Then need to turn left from Kumbukulawa junction which is  Polpithigama town.

The village got its name due to the nearby lake called "Pothuwila". 
Pothuwila village was founded by settlers came from kingdom of Kandy and nobles among the first settlers  proclaimed village name Pothuwila as their surname ("Waasagama"). There are few families still bear this noble surname to this day but not many are left.

Geography and climate

Geography
Topographically Pothuwila village is based on a plain area with the exception of the surrounding rock outcrops. The northern part of the town is slightly higher than the south. The Pothuwila Lake is the primary geographical feature of Pothuwila. The region comprising the Pothuwila village is located well above the sea level compared to the coastal areas of Sri Lanka. However, the region is not as high as the central hill country of the island. The nearest beaches to Pothuwila are to the western coastal areas and include Negombo and Chilaw.

Climate
Pothuwila features a tropical rainforest climate. The village's climate is tropical and hot all throughout the year. The only major change in the Pothuwila weather occurs during the monsoons from May to August and October to January, this is the time of year where heavy rains can be expected. While the city does experience noticeably drier weather during January and February, it does not qualify as a true dry season as average precipitation in both months are above . In general, temperatures from late November to mid-February period are lower than the rest of the year.

Important government places

 Siri Parakum Madayama Maha Vidyalaya
 Primary Medical Care Unit Pothuwila/CD Pothuwila

Nature
 Pothuwila Lake
 Hakwatuna Oya

The rocks
Pothuwila is surrounded by several rock outcrops, a distinctive geological feature of the North Western Province of Sri Lanka. But the main one near Pothuwila is Yapahuwa, which is just 20 mins drive from Pothuwila.

References

External links

Populated places in Kurunegala District